Pulse compression is a  signal processing technique commonly used by  radar, sonar and echography to either increase the range resolution when pulse length is constrained or increase the signal to noise ratio when the peak power and the bandwidth (or equivalently range resolution) of the transmitted signal are constrained. This is achieved by modulating the transmitted pulse and then correlating the received signal with the transmitted pulse.

Simple pulse

Signal description 
The ideal model for the simplest, and historically first type of signals a pulse radar or sonar can transmit is a truncated sinusoidal pulse (also called a CW --carrier wave-- pulse), of amplitude  and carrier frequency, truncated by a rectangular function of width, . The pulse is transmitted periodically, but that is not the main topic of this article; we will consider only a single pulse, . If we assume the pulse to start at time , the signal can be written the following way, using the complex notation:

Range resolution 
Let us determine the range resolution which can be obtained with such a signal. The return signal, written , is an attenuated and time-shifted copy of the original transmitted signal (in reality, Doppler effect can play a role too, but this is not important here.) There is also noise in the incoming signal, both on the imaginary and the real channel, which we will assume to be white and Gaussian (this generally holds in reality); we write  to denote that noise. To detect the incoming signal, matched filtering is commonly used. This method is optimal when a known signal is to be detected among additive white Gaussian noise.

In other words, the cross-correlation of the received signal with the transmitted signal is computed. This is achieved by convolving the incoming signal with a conjugated and time-reversed version of the transmitted signal. This operation can be done either in software or with hardware. We write  for this cross-correlation. We have:

If the reflected signal comes back to the receiver at time  and is attenuated by factor , this yields:

Since we know the transmitted signal, we obtain:

where , is the result of the intercorrelation between the noise and the transmitted signal. Figures at the end of this paragraph show the shape of the intercorrelation for a sample signal (in red), in this case a real truncated sine, of duration  seconds, of unit amplitude, and frequency  hertz. Two echoes (in blue) come back with delays of 3 and 5 seconds and amplitudes equal to 0.5 and 0.3 times the amplitude of the transmitted pulse, respectively; these are just random values for the sake of the example. Since the signal is real, the intercorrelation is weighted by an additional  factor.

If two pulses come back (nearly) at the same time, the intercorrelation is equal to the sum of the intercorrelations of the two elementary signals. To distinguish one "triangular" envelope from that of the other pulse, it is clearly visible that the times of arrival of the two pulses must be separated by at least  so that the maxima of both pulses can be separated. If this condition is not met, both triangles will be mixed together and impossible to separate.

Required energy to transmit that signal 
The energy put into that signal is:

If  is the standard deviation of the noise (generally taken after bandpass filtering the received signal, see below), the signal-to-noise ratio (SNR) at the receiver is:

The SNR is proportional to pulse duration , if other parameters are held constant. This introduces a tradeoff: increasing  improves the SNR, but reduces the resolution, and vice versa.

Pulse compression by linear frequency modulation (or chirping)

Basic principles 
How can one have a large enough pulse (to still have a good SNR at the receiver) without poor resolution? This is where pulse compression enters the picture. The basic principle is the following:
 a signal is transmitted, with a long enough length so that the energy budget is correct
 this signal is designed so that after matched filtering, the width of the intercorrelated signals is smaller than the width obtained by the standard sinusoidal pulse, as explained above (hence the name of the technique: pulse compression).

In radar or sonar applications, linear chirps are the most typically used signals to achieve pulse compression. The pulse being of finite length, the amplitude is a rectangle function.

The chirp definition above means that the phase of the chirped signal (that is, the argument of the complex exponential), is the quadratic:

thus the instantaneous frequency is (by definition):

The relation of phase to frequency is often used in the other direction, starting with the desired  and writing the chirp phase via the integration of frequency:

Cross-correlation between the transmitted and the received signal 
As for the "simple" pulse, let us compute the cross-correlation between the transmitted and the received signal. To simplify things, we shall consider that the chirp is not written as it is given above, but in this alternate form (the final result will be the same):

Everything happens as if, after matched filtering, we had the resolution that would have been reached with a simple pulse of duration .

Since the cardinal sine can have annoying sidelobes, a common practice is to filter the result by a window (Hamming, Hann, etc.). In practice, this can be done at the same time as the adapted filtering by multiplying the reference chirp with the filter. The result will be a signal with a slightly lower maximum amplitude, but the sidelobes will be filtered out, which is more important.

Signal-to-noise gain after correlation 

The energy of the signal does not vary during pulse compression. If  is the power of the signal before compression, and  the power of the signal after compression, energy  is conserved and we have:

which yields an increase in power after pulse compression:

This spectral density remains the same after matched filtering. 

Imagining now an equivalent sinusoidal (CW) pulse of duration  and identical input power, this equivalent sinusoidal pulse has an energy:

  

After matched filtering, the equivalent sinusoidal pulse turns into a triangular-shaped signal of twice its original width but the same peak power. Energy is conserved. The spectral domain is approximated by a nearly constant spectral density  in interval  where . Through conservation of energy, we have:

  

This means that the net effect of pulse compression is that, compared to the equivalent CW pulse, the signal-to-noise ratio (SNR) has improved by a factor  because the signal is amplified but not the noise. 

As a consequence:
 

 

For technical reasons, correlation is not necessarily done for actual received CW pulses as for chirped pulses.

This gain in the SNR seems magical, but remember that the power spectral density does not represent the phase of the signal. In reality the phases are different for the equivalent CW pulse, the CW pulse after correlation, the original chirped pulse and the correlated chirped pulse, which explains the different shapes of the signals (especially the varying lengths) despite having (nearly) the same power spectrum in all cases. If the peak transmitting power  and the bandwidth  are constrained, pulse compression thus achieves a better peak power (but same resolution) by transmitting a longer pulse (that is, more energy), compared to an equivalent CW pulse of same peak power  and bandwidth , and squeezing the pulse by correlation. This works best only for a limited number of signal types which, after correlation, have a narrower peak than the original signal, and low sidelobes.

Stretch processing
While pulse compression can ensure good SNR and fine range resolution in the same time, digital signal processing in such a system can be difficult to implement because of the high instantaneous bandwidth of the waveform ( can be hundreds of megahertz or even exceed 1 GHz.) 
Stretch Processing is a technique for matched filtering of wideband chirping waveform and is suitable for applications seeking very fine range resolution over relatively short range intervals.

Picture above shows the scenario for analyzing stretch processing.

If the transmitted waveform is the chirp waveform:

then the echo from the target at distance can be expressed as:

where  is proportional to the scatterer reflectivity.

where  is the wavelength of electromagnetic wave in air.

After conducting sampling and discrete Fourier transform on y(t) the sinusoid frequency  can be solved:

and the differential range  can be obtained:

If the target is at the lower bound of the range window, the echo will arrive  seconds after transmission; similarly, If the target is at the upper bound of the range window, the echo will arrive  seconds after transmission.

We can then obtain the bandwidth by considering the difference in sinusoid frequency for targets at the lower and upper bound of the range window:

As a consequence:
 

 
To demonstrate that stretch processing preserves range resolution, we need to understand that y(t) is actually an impulse train with pulse duration T and period , which is equal to the period of the transmitted impulse train. As a result, the Fourier transform of y(t) is actually a sinc function with Rayleigh resolution .

Consequently, 

and,

which is the same as the resolution of the original linear frequency modulation waveform.

Stepped-frequency waveform 
In addition, the effective wavelength of the electromagnetic wave changes during the frequency sweep of a chirp signal, and therefore the antenna look direction will be inevitably changed in a Phased array system.

Stepped-frequency waveforms are an alternative technique that can preserve fine range resolution and SNR of the received signal without large instantaneous bandwidth. The baseband signal can be expressed as:

where  is a rectangular impulse of length  and M is the number of pulses in a single pulse train. As a result, the problem mentioned above can be avoided.

To calculate the distance of the target corresponding to a delay , individual pulses are processed through the simple pulse matched filter:

and the output of the matched filter is:

where

where l means the range bin l.
Conduct DTFT (m is served as time here) and we can get:

,and the peak of the summation occurs when .

Consequently, the DTFT of  provides a measure of the delay of the target relative to the range bin delay :

and the differential range can be obtained:

where c is the speed of light.

As a result:

and therefore the differential range resolution is :

which is the same of the resolution of the original linear-frequency-modulation waveform.

Pulse compression by phase coding 

There are other means to modulate the signal. Phase modulation is a commonly used technique; in this case, the pulse is divided in  time slots of duration  for which the phase at the origin is chosen according to a pre-established convention. The precise way of choosing the sequence of  phases can be done according to a technique known as Barker codes. 

Other binary sequences, that are pseudo-random, have nearly optimal pulse compression properties, such as Gold codes, JPL codes or Kasami codes, because their autocorrelation peak is very narrow. These sequences have other interesting properties making them suitable for GNSS positioning, for instance. 

It is possible to code the sequence on more than two phases (polyphase coding). As with a linear chirp, pulse compression is achieved through intercorrelation.

See also
Continuous-wave radar
Spread spectrum
Chirp compression

Notes

Further reading
 Nadav Levanon, and Eli Mozeson. Radar signals. Wiley. com, 2004.
 Hao He, Jian Li, and Petre Stoica. Waveform design for active sensing systems: a computational approach. Cambridge University Press, 2012.
 M. Soltanalian. Signal Design for Active Sensing and Communications. Uppsala Dissertations from the Faculty of Science and Technology (printed by Elanders Sverige AB), 2014.
 Solomon W. Golomb, and Guang Gong. Signal design for good correlation: for wireless communication, cryptography, and radar. Cambridge University Press, 2005.
 Fulvio Gini, Antonio De Maio, and Lee Patton, eds. Waveform design and diversity for advanced radar systems. Institution of engineering and technology, 2012.
 John J. Benedetto, Ioannis Konstantinidis, and Muralidhar Rangaswamy. "Phase-coded waveforms and their design." IEEE Signal Processing Magazine, 26.1 (2009): 22-31.
 Ducoff, Michael R., and Byron W. Tietjen. "Pulse compression radar." Radar Handbook (2008): 8-3.

Signal processing
Radar signal processing